The Algama (Sakha and , also Алгома Algoma) is a river in Sakha Republic and Khabarovsk Krai, Russia. It is a right tributary of the Gonam.

See also
List of rivers of Russia

References

External links 
 Article in the Great Soviet Encyclopedia

Rivers of the Sakha Republic
Rivers of Khabarovsk Krai